The Awakening (1980) is a  statue by J. Seward Johnson, Jr. that depicts a giant embedded in the earth, struggling to free himself. It is located at National Harbor in Prince George's County, Maryland, United States, just outside the District of Columbia.

Description
The statue consists of five separate aluminum pieces buried in the ground, giving the impression of a distressed giant attempting to free himself from the ground. The left hand and right foot barely protrude, while the bent left leg and knee jut into the air. The bearded face, with the mouth in mid-scream, struggles to emerge from the earth.

History 

The Awakening was created by J. Seward Johnson, Jr. in 1980 as part of Washington, DC's 11th annual Sculpture Conference, and the sculpture was originally installed at Hains Point in East Potomac Park, Washington, D.C.. Hains Point was designated by Congress as the site for a National Peace Garden in 1987. Although no work had started on the National Peace Garden for many years, the decision still prompted the eventual sale of the sculpture by its owner, The Sculpture Foundation. 

Real estate developer Milton Peterson purchased the sculpture for over $700,000 in 2007 for installation at his new National Harbor development in Maryland. Crews removed The Awakening from Hains Point in February 2008 for its move to National Harbor. At the National Harbor development, the sculpture was installed on a specially built beach along the Potomac River.

The Awakening II
Seward Johnson created a copy of The Awakening, which was unveiled in Chesterfield, Missouri on October 10, 2009. The sculpture is located adjacent to Chesterfield Central Park, near the intersection of Chesterfield Parkway and Park Circle Drive to the west of Chesterfield Mall. The installation of the sculpture in Chesterfield was commissioned by Chesterfield Arts, which is a non-profit arts organization supporting public art and the visual, performing and literary arts in Chesterfield and the West County. $1 million in funding was provided by Sachs Properties.

Il Risveglio
A fiberglass copy of The Awakening, also made by Seward Johnson, has been exhibited in at least three places in Italy,  where it is called Il Risveglio.  It was installed there first in April 2009 on Piazza Duomo (Cathedral Square) on the island of Ortygia, the historic, old part of Syracuse, Sicily at the time of some G8 meetings in Italy.  In December of that year, it was moved to the EUR district of Rome, in connection with a commemoration of twenty years since the fall of the Berlin Wall.  It was installed next to an obelisk in the Piazza Guglielmo Marconi.  Finally, in May of 2011, it was installed in Viterbo in the Valle di Faul (Faul Valley).

Gallery

See also 
 The Bassin d'Encelade (1675–1677), a similar sculpture at Versailles, France
 La Mano de Punta del Este (1982), a sculptural hand emerging from the ground in Uruguay
 Mano del Desierto (1992), a giant hand emerging from the ground in the Atacama Desert, Chile

References

External links 

 Sculptor's website
 "Our Awakening", a column
 Smithsonian American Art Museum Art Inventories Catalog entry
 Washington Post slideshow of the move from Hains Point to National Harbor in 2008
  (2 minutes)

1980 sculptures
Buildings and structures in Prince George's County, Maryland
Outdoor sculptures in Maryland
Colossal statues in the United States
Aluminum sculptures in Maryland
Sculptures by John Seward Johnson II
1980 establishments in Maryland